Alessandro Minelli (born 23 July 1999) is an Italian professional footballer who plays as a defender for  club Virtus Francavilla on loan from Juventus.

Club career

Early career
He started his senior career in Serie D with Olginatese in the 2015–16 season. For the next two seasons he played for the Under-19 squads of Inter Milan and Pescara.

Rende
On 19 July 2018, he signed his first professional contract with Serie C club Rende for a two-year term. He made his Serie C debut for Rende on 16 September 2018 in a game against Paganese, as a starter.

Parma

Loan to Rende
On 30 January 2019, he signed a 4.5-year contract with Parma and was loaned back to Rende until the end of the 2018–19 season.

Loan to Trapani
On 2 September 2019, he joined Serie B club Trapani on loan.

Juventus
On 31 January 2020, Parma terminated his loan to Trapani early and sold his rights to Juventus.

Loans
On 4 September 2020, he joined Bari on loan with an option to purchase.

On 6 August 2021, he joined Cosenza on loan.

On 21 January 2022, he moved on a new loan to Pro Vercelli in Serie C.

On 1 September 2022, Minelli was loaned by Virtus Francavilla.

Honours and achievements

Club 
Juventus U23
 Coppa Italia Serie C: 2019–20

References

External links
 

1999 births
Sportspeople from Monza
Footballers from Lombardy
Living people
Italian footballers
Association football defenders
U.S.D. Olginatese players
Trapani Calcio players
Juventus Next Gen players
S.S.C. Bari players
Cosenza Calcio players
F.C. Pro Vercelli 1892 players
Virtus Francavilla Calcio players
Serie B players
Serie C players
Serie D players